Lucila Luciani de Pérez Díaz (21January 18828March 1971) was a Venezuelan historian, musician and feminist. She was the first woman Director of the Teacher's Normal School, served as the librarian of the Ministry of Foreign Affairs and became the Deputy Director of the National Library. She was the first woman inducted into the National Academy of History and was Venezuela's delegate for the inaugural body of the Inter-American Commission of Women. She was one of the founders of the feminist movement in Venezuela and published the feminist magazine Iris.

Biography 
Lucila Luciani Eduardo was born on 21 January 1882 in Maracaibo, Zulia, Venezuela to Juan Nepomuceno Luciani and Casimira Eduardo. She was educated in Venezuela, the United States and France, and studied piano and violin with renowned instructors like Ramón Delgado Palacios. She performed abroad at both private and public concerts, returning in 1909 to Venezuela and marrying the pioneering dermatologist, Manuel Pérez Díaz (1872–1931), with whom she had eight children.

Luciani began her career writing historical and feminist articles, literary critiques and essays for journals and newspapers She published several short stories, and in 1919, she published her first book, La batalla de Boyacá: su importancia militar y política, which won the award of the Academy of History of Venezuela in the early 1920s.

In 1928, when the Inter-American Commission of Women (CIM) was founded, Luciani was designated as one of the inaugural members. Doris Stevens, who had suggested the commission to investigate the disparity of laws effecting women throughout the Americas, was appointed as chair and the other six countries were selected by lot. The chosen countries were Argentina, Colombia, El Salvador, Haiti, Panama, and Venezuela and the appointed delegates were Dr. Ernestina A. López de Nelson from Argentina, María Elena de Hinestrosa from Colombia, María Alvárez de Guillén Rivas from El Salvador, Alice Téligny Mathon from Haiti, Clara González from Panama and Luciani from Venezuela. That same year, she began publishing Iris: revista de acción social and remained as its director until 1941. The magazine was published in conjunction with the Unión de Damas de la Acción Católica, (Union of Catholic Women of Action) of which Luciani was founder and first president, but was a feminist journal.

When her husband died in 1931, Luciani became sole support of her large family and began teaching. Between 1934 and 1935 she taught at the Escuela Normal para Mujeres (Female Teacher's Normal School) and in 1936 became its first female Director. That same year, she also served as the Director of the Colegio Cháves and worked as a librarian at the Ministry of Foreign Affairs. In 1939 she became the Deputy Director of the Biblioteca Nacional (National Library) and in 1940, she was awarded the first chair (number 10) ever given to a woman at the National Academy of History.

She represented Venezuela in several international conferences. Besides her travel and research work with the CIM, Luciani attended the International Congress of the Union of Catholic Women held in Santiago, Chile in 1936. In 1941, she was appointed as the first female President of Venezuela's Catholic Conference and in 1945, she served in Venezuela's delegation to the conference in San Francisco which resulted in the founding of the United Nations.

Luciani died on 8 March 1971 in Caracas, Venezuela.

Selected works

References

Sources 

1882 births
1971 deaths
Venezuelan women's rights activists
Venezuelan women writers
Venezuelan feminists
Venezuelan musicians
Venezuelan women historians
20th-century Venezuelan historians
20th-century Venezuelan women writers
Women historians
Venezuelan people of Italian descent
Feminist musicians